The 2023 Nigerian Senate elections in Nasarawa State will be held on 25 February 2023, to elect the 3 federal Senators from Nasarawa State, one from each of the state's three senatorial districts. The elections will coincide with the 2023 presidential election, as well as other elections to the Senate and elections to the House of Representatives; with state elections being held two weeks later. Primaries were held between 4 April and 9 June 2022.

Background
In the previous Senate elections, only one of the three incumbent senators were returned as Abdullahi Adamu (APC-West) was re-elected while Philip Aruwa Gyunka (PDP-North) retired and Suleiman Adokwe (PDP-South) was defeated. Godiya Akwashiki gained the open North district for the APC with 41.2% of the vote while APC challenger Umaru Tanko Al-Makura unseated Adokwe with 49.5%; in the western seat, Adamu was re-elected with 49.6%. These results were a part of the continuation of the Nasarawa APC's slight advantage as the party won three of five House of Representatives seats, held the governorship along with its majority in the state House of Assembly, and Buhari narrowly won the state in the presidential election.

During the 2019–2023 term, Adamu and Al-Makura both ran for APC National Chairman in 2022 with Al-Makura withdrawing right before Adamu was affirmed to the office. After taking office as party chair, Adamu resigned from the Senate in April 2022 in a move that left the West district open for the remainder of the term. For Akwashiki, he defected from the APC to the SDP in July 2022 to obtain the party's senatorial nomination for his re-election campaign.

Overview

Summary

Nasarawa North 

The Nasarawa North Senatorial District covers the local government areas of Akwanga, Eggon, and Wamba. The incumbent Godiya Akwashiki (SDP) was elected with 41.2% of the vote in 2019 as a member of the APC; he defected to the SDP in July 2022. He is running for re-election.

Primary elections

All Progressives Congress 

In the years before the primary, the state APC underwent a small-scale dispute between two senators that used to be governor: Abdullahi Adamu and Umaru Tanko Al-Makura while Governor Abdullahi Sule and Akwashiki mostly stood on the sidelines but leaned towards Al-Makura. The disagreement intensified into a subtle cold war when Adamu resigned from the Senate to become APC National Chairman in March 2022 and gained extensive power over the party at-large leading to rumours that he was planning on replacing Al-Makura and Akwashiki with closer allies. Although Al-Makura ended up unopposed in his primary, Akwashiki was targeted as Danladi Halilu Envulu'Anza announced his candidacy. Akwashiki and Envulu'Anza were longtime political rivals and their dispute had only escalated in 2019 when Envulu'Anza and his associates assaulted Akwashiki for his alleged attempt to woo Envulu'Anza's wife. Pundits noted Adamu's open support for Envulu'Anza and categorized the primary as a proxy battle between Adamu and Al-Makura.

In the days before the primary, reports of delegate list manipulation by Adamu in favor of Envulu'Anza led to protests within the party along with a statement from the state party chairman requesting the national secretariat to refrain from further meddling. In the wake of the reports, Akwashiki announced his withdrawal from the primary on 29 May. In the primary, Envulu'Anza easily won the nomination as journalists noted that the manipulated "Abuja list" of delegates was used to determine eligible delegates. The next month, Akwashiki defected to the SDP to obtain its nomination.

People's Democratic Party 

In the PDP primary, Nathaniel Obin Aboki—a businessman—was nominated with just under a majority of the delegates' votes at 46.3%.

Campaign 
After Akwashiki's decampment, pundits reiterated the strength of Envulu'Anza's candidacy but noted that the district's former APC base had split between him and Akwashiki in the SDP. The observation was in the context of wider infighting within the Nasarawa APC throughout the post-primary period. In campaign analysis from December 2022, The Nation labeled Akwashiki as the frontrunner due to his crossover support from APC groups and Aboki's weak grassroots support.

General election

Results

Nasarawa South 

The Nasarawa South Senatorial District covers the local government areas of Awe, Doma, Keana, Lafia and Obi. The incumbent Umaru Tanko Al-Makura (APC), who was elected with 49.5% of the vote in 2019, is seeking re-election.

Primary elections

All Progressives Congress 

In the years before the primary, the state APC underwent a dispute between Senator Abdullahi Adamu and Al-Makura; the disagreement intensified into a when Adamu became APC National Chairman in March 2022 and gained extensive power over the party at-large leading to rumours that he was planning on replacing Al-Makura with a closer ally. However, only Al-Makura was a candidate by the primary date and he was renominated via affirmation in Lafia. In his post-primary remarks, Al-Makura pledged loyalty to the APC and thanked delegates.

People's Democratic Party

Campaign
In campaign analysis from December 2022, The Nation reporting noted that Onawo is of the larger ethnic Alago community and Al-Makura is of the smaller Gwandara ethnicity, but also categorized the election as one of few in the state to not appear to be dominated by ethnicity-based support patterns. Overall, the newspaper labeled the race as a "50/50" between Onawo and Al-Makura while noting the potential effects of Musa Abdullahi (NNPP) and Adamu Muazu Allu (SDP).

General election

Results

Nasarawa West 

The Nasarawa West Senatorial District covers the local government areas of Karu, Keffi, Kokona, Nasarawa and Toto. The seat is vacant as Senator Abdullahi Adamu (APC), who was re-elected with 49.6% of the vote in 2019, resigned from the Senate on 12 April 2022 to focus on his new position as the APC National Chairman. Despite a constitutional stipulation that by-elections must be held after a vacancy, INEC did not schedule a by-election amid its preparations for prescheduled elections in 2022 and 2023.

Primary elections

All Progressives Congress 

Like the Nasarawa North APC primary, in the days before the primary, reports of delegate list manipulation by Adamu led to protests within the party along with a statement from the state party chairman requesting the national secretariat to refrain from further meddling. Adamu backed Shehu Tukur over former MHR Ahmed Wadada or Labaran Magaji, leading Wadada to withdraw and leave the party to obtain the SDP nomination while Magaji continued onto the APC primary. On the primary date, the exercise was disrupted and later postponed due to a group of Magaji-supporting protesters decrying the altered delegate list. On 6 June, a new primary was conducted at the Nasarawa State University in Keffi that resulted in a Tukur victory after results showed him defeating Magaji by a significant margin. However, Magaji immediately rejected the results and launched a legal challenge based on the delegate list scandal amid further party crisis. In early November, the lawsuit succeeded as a Federal High Court ruling annulled the APC primary and ordered the party to conduct a new primary with the original delegate list. Although the state APC set the new primary date as 12 November, Tukur appealed the High Court ruling leading the rerun to be postponed.

People's Democratic Party 

On the primary date, four candidates contested an indirect primary in Keffi that ended with Umar Galadima winning the nomination after results showed him defeating Bala Ahmed Aliyu by a significant margin. In his acceptance speech, Galadima thanked delegates and asked his former opponents to work with him.

Campaign
In campaign analysis from December 2022, The Nation reporting labeled Wadada (SDP) as the frontrunner due to his crossover support from APC groups and Galadima's weak grassroots support. The next month, OrderPaper Nigeria also noted the APC primary crisis as a key weakness of its campaigning but Wadada's weakness was the relatively smaller size of the SDP.

General election

Results

See also 
 2023 Nigerian Senate election
 2023 Nigerian elections

Notes

References 

Nasarawa State senatorial elections
2023 Nasarawa State elections
Nasarawa State Senate elections